Shyam Thapa is a retired Indian footballer who played for the India national football team and was the bronze-medallist at the 1970 Asian Games. He also managed the Nepal national football team. Coached by P. K. Banerjee, Thapa became one of the finest and aggressive strikers of the country during the 1970s.

Playing career
Shyam Thapa was first discovered when he scored the match winner for Gorkha Military Higher Secondary School (HSS) against Anjuman Islam Higher secondary school, Mumbai in the 1964 Subroto Mukherjee Cup final. The East Bengal supremo Jyotish Chandra Guha, who had a good eye for talent, signed him for the 1966 season. Shyam made a memorable debut as a precocious 18-year-old in the 1966 Calcutta Football League, scoring a hat-trick against Rajasthan Football Club. Afterwards, he returned to Gorkha Brigade and played for them from 1967–1969.

His finest hour came in the 1969 Durand final when he scored an opportunistic match winner in the reply against redoubtable Border Security Force (BSF). General Maneckshaw witnessed that match and invited the entire Gorkha Brigade team for a party the next day. At that party, Shyam requested Maneckshaw, who became a Field Marshal later, to release him from the army so that he could pursue his career as a professional. The General agreed and Shyam Thapa joined East Bengal again in 1970.

In 1970, Thapa helped India win bronze medal in Merdeka tournament. In that year, he won bronze at the Bangkok Asian Games, with P. K. Banerjee managed and Syed Nayeemuddin captained team. He scored in India's 3–0 win over Indonesia in the 1970 Asian Games and also in the 3–1 win over Malaysia in the Merdeka tournament. That year, East Bengal played in the 4–2–4 system and their quintet of forwards Swapan Sengupta, Ashok Chatterjee, Mohammed Habib and Shyam Thapa were all short-statured but explosive, skilful and a delight to watch with their flair and incessant attacking play. They were brilliant in the Durand tournament which East Bengal won by easily overcoming RAC Bikaner, Sikh Regimental Centre (SRC) Meerut, Mafatlal Mills and Mohun Bagan 2–0 in the final.

Shyam Thapa's career, however, suffered a setback. His family was worried about the increasing Naxalite violence in Kolkata and asked him to leave. He took a transfer to Mafatlal Mills, Bombay and linked up with former Gorkha Brigade players like Ranjit Thapa, Bhupender Singh Rawat and Amar Bahadur. He stayed with Mafatlal Mills from 1971–74.

However, he soon rejoined East Bengal in 1975. He was by then an established superstar and had a memorable 1975–76 season. Coached by P. K. Banerjee, East Bengal won the Kolkata league for a record sixth year in a row and in the IFA Shield final routed eternal rivals Mohun Bagan 5–0, a record score in a final. Shyam scored some memorable goals for East Bengal in those two years.

He became India's most sought after player and in the 1977–78 season, Mohun Bagan paid a record fee of Rs. 50,000 for his services. He was the highest paid player in India that year and helped Bagan win a historic treble – IFA Shield, Rovers Cup and Durand tournament, in a single season and his brilliant goal against rivals East Bengal in an IFA league match with a back volley is still remembered. It was the first time Bagan achieved this feat. In the Durand Cup final, he scored the equalizer against JCT, darting onto a rebound from goalkeeper Surjeet Singh and bulging the net. In the replay, he set up the match winner for Mohammed Akbar.

From 1977–1980, he figured in four consecutive Durand finals for Mohun Bagan winning in 1977, 1979 and 1980 and losing 0–3 to East Bengal in the 1978 final. During the same period, Mohun Bagan also won the IFA Shield thrice in a row, 1977–79 and the Rovers Cup in 1977. From 1970–77, he was a regular in the Indian team. He played as striker in Mohun Bagan's historic match against a star-studded New York Cosmos spearheaded by Pelé on 24 September 1977, in which both the teams shared honours as the match ended 2–2. Under P. K. Banerjee's guidance, their performance against the American club featuring Pelé, Carlos Alberto Torres and Giorgio Chinaglia, earned popularity worldwide.

However, after the 1978 Srinagar National championships, he was surprisingly omitted from the list of probables for the 1978 Asian Games. The national selectors claimed that he was slowing down and would not be able to cope with the rigours of international football. There was a major hue and cry in the national media at Shyam's unfair omission.

Retirement and post football life
Reacting to the media criticism, Field Marshal Sam Maneckshaw, boss of the All India Council of Sports (AICS) intervened and invited Shyam to join the training camp being held in Patiala. However he announced his retirement from international football. Being denied the captaincy of the Indian team in the 1978 Asian Games has been Shyam's biggest disappointment in his otherwise glittering career.

After his playing career was over, he was technical director at the Williamson Magor Academy in Assam which later closed down and later at the Tata Football Academy. Such is Shyam Thapa's fame that Nepal called him to revamp their football system in the 21st century and he was there in the first decade of the 21st century. He also managed East Bengal Club in the late 1980s. He later served as the chairman of All India Football Federation technical committee, before AIFF faced suspension from the FIFA.

Honours & achievements

India
Asian Games Bronze Medal: 1970
Merdeka Tournament third place: 1970
Pesta Sukan Cup (Singapore): 1971

Bengal
Santosh Trophy runner-up: 1968–69

East Bengal
IFA Shield: 1970, 1975

Mohun Bagan
Federation Cup: 1978–79, 1980–81

Individual
Banga Bhushan: 2014 (by the Government of West Bengal)
Mohun Bagan Ratna: 2022
 East Bengal "Lifetime Achievement Award": 2016

See also
 Indian Gorkha
 List of India international footballers born outside India

External links
Pele's team Cosmos 2–2 Mohun Bagan 24 Sept 1977

References

Bibliography

 

 
 

Chattopadhyay, Hariprasad (2017). Mohun Bagan–East Bengal . Kolkata: Parul Prakashan.

1948 births
Living people
People from Gulmi District
Sportspeople from Dehradun
Footballers from Uttarakhand
Indian Gorkhas
Asian Games bronze medalists for India
Asian Games medalists in football
Indian footballers
Association football forwards
Medalists at the 1970 Asian Games
Footballers at the 1970 Asian Games
Footballers at the 1974 Asian Games
Mohun Bagan AC players
East Bengal Club players
Indian football managers
East Bengal Club managers
Nepal national football team managers
Indian expatriate football managers
Indian expatriate sportspeople in Nepal
Expatriate football managers in Nepal
Calcutta Football League players
Mumbai Football League players